The 1989 Ohio Valley Conference men's basketball tournament was the final event of the 1988–89 season in the Ohio Valley Conference. The tournament was held March 7-9, 1989, on campus sites and at the Nashville Municipal Auditorium in Nashville, Tennessee.

Middle Tennessee State defeated  in the championship game, 82–79, to win their fifth OVC men's basketball tournament.

The Blue Raiders received an automatic bid to the 1989 NCAA tournament as the #13 seed in the Southeast region.

Bracket

References

Ohio Valley Conference men's basketball tournament
Basketball competitions in Nashville, Tennessee
Tournament
Ohio Valley Conference men's basketball tournament
Ohio Valley Conference men's basketball tournament
College sports tournaments in Tennessee